British Invasion is an annual British automobile show and cultural celebration held in Stowe, Vermont. The multiple events that comprise British Invasion take place over several days during the third weekend of September. Events of the weekend include a driving tour of Lake Champlain islands, a driving tour of Smuggler's Notch, Concours d'Elegance judging, and a tailgating competition with themed picnic lunches.

The main car show, held on Saturday, uses a field just north of the center of town, and runs from morning until evening. Show cars are divided into approximately sixty categories and organized by marque when parked on the field.

History
In October 1989, Michael Gaetano and Chris Francis (proprietor of the town's Ye Olde England Inne) discussed the possibility of inviting members of British car clubs to Stowe for an event. After receiving positive response from clubs and interest from corporate sponsors, the date of the first British Invasion was set for September 1991.

Featured marques

External links
British Invasion

References

Automotive events
Stowe, Vermont